Louis Steven Obeegadoo is a politician from Mauritius who is serving as Deputy Prime Minister of Mauritius. He also serves as Minister of Housing and Land Use Planning, and as Minister of Tourism.

Obeegadoo also served as temporary Chairman of UNESCO during 2006 to 2008, and as Education Minister.

Personal life
Obeegadoo is married. He has a B.Sc. in economics and a M.Sc. in politics from the London School of Economics & Political Science, and a postgraduate diploma in law from The City University, London.

References 

Living people
Year of birth missing (living people)
Deputy Prime Ministers of Mauritius
UNESCO officials